Grafenbach-Sankt Valentin is a town in the district of Neunkirchen in the Austrian state of Lower Austria.

Geography 
Grafenbach_St. Valtentin lies southwest of Ternitz in the Schwarzatal. It has an area of 13.9 km2. 15.54% of its area is forested.

History 
In ancient times, the municipality was part of the Roman province of Noricum. There is a 9th-century burial ground near Grafenbach.

Population

References

Cities and towns in Neunkirchen District, Austria